Admiral Adhar Kumar Chatterji (4 March 1914 – 6 August 2001) was an Admiral in the Indian Navy. He served as the 6th Chief of the Naval Staff, from 4 March 1966, until 28 February 1970. He was the first Indian officer of the navy to hold the rank of full Admiral. He is credited with the transformation of the Indian Navy. He made sweeping changes and restructured the navy, creating the Western and Eastern Naval Commands and the Western Fleet.

Early life
Chatterji was born in Dacca on 22 November 1914. He attended the Presidency College (as a graduating student of the University of Calcutta), graduating in 1933. The same year he saw a notice at the college about the relaxation of entry criteria for the Royal Indian Marine. He applied for and topped the Federal Public Service examination.

Naval career

Early career
Chatterji was one of the first Indian cadet-entry officers to join the Royal Indian Navy in 1933. After training on board the Indian Mercantile Marine Training Ship (IMMTS) Dufferin, he was sent to the United Kingdom. He was commissioned into the Royal Indian Navy as a sub-lieutenant on 1 September 1935. He spent four years training on different ships. On 1 September 1938, he was promoted to the rank of lieutenant. In 1939, he was selected to specialise in anti-submarine warfare (ASW) and trained in the UK. He completed the course in August 1940 and was appointed an instructor at the ASW training school - HMS Osprey, Portland.

World War II
In late 1940, he was transferred to the Black Swan-class sloop . On 1 January 1942, he was appointed the first officer-in-charge of the ASW school in India - at castle barracks. He also served on board the Black Swan-class sloop . On 23 October 1944, he was promoted to the acting rank of lieutenant-commander and appointed commanding officer of the Bangor-class minesweeper . Kathiawar was a part of the Eastern Fleet, and escorted numerous convoys between Africa, British India and Australia in 1943-45. He then was appointed officer-in-charge of the radar school HMIS Chamak in Karachi. He was promoted to substantive lieutenant-commander on 1 September 1946. In January 1947, he was selected to attend the Royal Naval College, Greenwich in the UK.

Post-Independence
Chatterji completed the staff course and returned to India in August 1947. He was hand-picked by the handpicked by the Chief of Staff to the Commander-in-Chief, Royal Indian Navy Commodore Martin Henry St. Leger Nott to head the Plans directorate as the Director of Naval Planning at Naval HQ in the rank of Commander. Among the officers serving under him in the directorate was Lieutenant Commander Nilakanta Krishnan. During this stint, he was the lead author of the Plan paper of 1948. In February 1949, he was appointed Commander (Executive Officer) of the flagship  and replaced Commander Ram Dass Katari. In June 1950, he was promoted to the acting rank of Captain and appointed commanding officer of the Delhi. He was the first Indian officer to command the ship. He relinquished command, handing over to Captain S. G. Karmarkar in October 1950.

In November 1950, Chatterji was appointed the Naval Adviser (NA) to the High Commissioner of India to the United Kingdom. He served as the NA to High Commissioners V. K. Krishna Menon and B. G. Kher. He oversaw the training of hundreds naval cadets and junior officers in the UK. He was promoted to the substantive rank of captain on 30 June 1951. In December 1952, he was appointed Captain (D) 11th Destroyer Flotilla as well as the Commanding Officer of the lead destroyer of the squadron . But the orders were cancelled and he took command of the Delhi for the second time in January 1953. In mid-1953, to commemorate the Coronation of Elizabeth II, a massive Coronation review of the fleet was held at Portsmouth. The flagship INS Delhi, commanded by Chatterji, destroyer INS Ranjit, commanded by Commander Sardarilal Mathradas Nanda, and the frigate , commanded by Commander Nilakanta Krishnan, represented India at the review. A naval armada consisting of ships from the Indian Navy, Royal Navy, Royal Australian Navy and the Royal New Zealand Navy sailed from Portsmouth to Gibraltar. The fleet carried out exercises along the way and was under the command of Lord Mountbatten.

In November 1954, Chatterji was promoted to the acting rank of Commodore. This made him the fourth Indian naval officer to be promoted to this rank, after Ajitendu Chakraverti, Ram Dass Katari and Bhaskar Sadashiv Soman. He was appointed the Commodore-in-Charge Bombay (COMBAY), taking over from Chakraverti. The Bombay Command was the predecessor of the Western Naval Command. He held this appointment for two years, till November 1956. In October 1956, Chatterji was selected to attend the Imperial Defence College (IDC) and embarked for the UK in early 1957. After completing the year-long course, he returned to India and was appointed the Deputy Chief of the Naval Staff on 8 February 1958.

Flag Rank
On 5 March 1959, the appointment was upgraded to two-star rank and Chatterji was promoted to the acting rank of Rear Admiral. Promotion to the substantive rank of Rear Admiral followed, on 5 March 1960. 

In May 1962, Chatterji took over as the fourth Flag Officer Commanding Indian Fleet. The aircraft carrier  had joined the Indian Navy in 1961 and was the flagship. AS commanding officer, Chatterji flew his flag on the Vikrant. In September 1962, he led the fleet in joint naval-air exercises in the Arabian Sea. Taking part were the aircraft embarked on the Vikrant, the aircraft from the Naval air station INS Garuda and the aircraft of the Indian Air Force. In mid-1963, Chatterji led the fleet in exercises in the Arabian Sea, Indian Ocean and the Bay of Bengal. After this, the fleet called on ports in Malaya, Singapore and Thailand. During the exercise and goodwill visit, Chatterji flew his flag on the flagship , which became the first Indian cruiser to visit Thailand. After commanding the Indian fleet for about two years, he relinquished command, handing over to Rear Admiral S.M. Nanda. In January 1964, Chatterji was promoted to the acting rank of Vice Admiral and appointed the second Commandant of the National Defence College. He was the first Naval Officer to hold the appointment.

Chief of Naval Staff
In November 1965, Chatterji was appointed the seventh Chief of the Naval Staff. On 4 March 1966, he took over from Vice Admiral Soman. He was confirmed in his rank of vice-admiral on 22 November 1966, and was promoted to the rank of Admiral on 1 March 1968, the first Indian officer to hold the rank.

Admiral Chatterji retired from the Indian Navy on 28 February 1970.

Death
Admiral Chatterji died in New Delhi.

Citations

References

1914 births
2001 deaths
Chiefs of the Naval Staff (India)
Indian Navy admirals
Flag Officers Commanding Indian Fleet
Deputy Chiefs of Naval Staff (India)
Commandants of National Defence College, India
University of Calcutta alumni
Royal Indian Navy officers
Graduates of the Royal College of Defence Studies
Indian naval attachés